The City of London Academy is the name given to six academy schools established in inner London with the support of the City of London Corporation (CLC):

 City of London Academy Highbury Grove
 City of London Academy Highgate Hill
 City of London Academy Islington
 City of London Academy, Shoreditch Park
 City of London Academy, Southwark
 City of London Primary Academy, Islington

See also
 City Academy, Hackney
 Newham Collegiate Sixth Form Centre